Bizarre Foods America is an American television series, and a spin-off of Bizarre Foods, this time focusing on the United States rather than international travel. Andrew Zimmern travels to various cities throughout the country (as well as Canada, Colombia, and Peru) and samples local cuisines and ways of life. The show premiered on Monday January 23, 2012, at 9:00 ET on Travel Channel.

Much like in the popular Bizarre Foods, Andrew heads to some of the most unusual food hubs in the country. There he meets with locals and chefs to gain a better understanding of American cuisine, to see how America has developed its reputation as a melting pot of cultures and foods, and to see what sort of unusual foods people in America might not realize they have in their own cities.

Starting October 27, 2014 the show is returning to its original format as Bizarre Foods.

Episodes

Season 1

Season 2

Season 3

Season 4

Season 5

Season 6

References

2012 American television series debuts
English-language television shows
Food travelogue television series
Travel Channel original programming
2014 American television series endings